Yonelvis Águila (born August 1, 1975) is a male  decathlete from Cuba.

Career

He set his personal best (7705 points) on February 23, 2002 in Havana.

Achievements

External links

Picture of Yonelvis Águila

References

1975 births
Living people
Cuban decathletes
Athletes (track and field) at the 2003 Pan American Games
Pan American Games medalists in athletics (track and field)
Pan American Games bronze medalists for Cuba
Medalists at the 2003 Pan American Games
20th-century Cuban people